PT United Tractors Tbk or United Tractors (UT/the Company) is a company that was established on 13 October 1972 as the exclusive distributor of Komatsu Limited heavy equipment in Indonesia. On 19 September 1989, the company went public and listed its shares in Indonesia Stock Exchange under UNTR ticker symbol, with Astra International as the majority shareholder. The company is also the exclusive distributor of UD Trucks, Bomag, Tadano and Scania AB.

Aside of being the largest distributor of heavy equipment in the country, the company also plays an active role in the field of mining contracting and has recently ventured into coal and gold mining businesses. Through its subsidiaries, the company owns and operates several coal mines of 400 million tons combined reserve and one of the largest gold mines in the world, Martabe mine. The three major business units are Construction Machinery, Mining Contracting and Mining. The portfolio of these three business units are prudently managed to provide stable profitability unlike a typical pure-play mining company which its profitability strongly depends on the volatile commodity prices. In 2012, when mining businesses were in decline, United Tractors still delivered net income of Rp 55,953 billion (US$5.593 billion) and was recognized as the sixth largest company in Indonesia according to Fortune 100.

Subsidiaries

Expansions
From 9 hectares area in Cibitung, Bekasi Regency, West Java, the company is building 3 hectares new factory to add 30 percent of current production. It will produce since Q4 2011.

References

External links
 Official website

Companies based in Jakarta
Vehicle manufacturing companies established in 1972
Indonesian companies established in 1972
1980s initial public offerings
Companies listed on the Indonesia Stock Exchange
Indonesian brands
Companies of Indonesia
Jardine Matheson Group